Decaturville is an unincorporated community in Washington County, in the U.S. state of Ohio.

History
The area now known as Decaturville was originally called "Upper Settlement", as it was settled somewhat later than the "Lower Settlement", i.e. Fillmore. A post office called Decaturville was established in 1851, and remained in operation until 1904.

References

Unincorporated communities in Washington County, Ohio
Unincorporated communities in Ohio